Mid Londonderry was a county constituency comprising the central part of County Londonderry. It was created in 1929, when the House of Commons (Method of Voting and Redistribution of Seats) Act (Northern Ireland) 1929 introduced first-past-the-post elections throughout Northern Ireland. It was one of five single-member constituencies replacing the former five-member Londonderry constituency. The constituency survived unchanged, returning one member of Parliament until the Parliament of Northern Ireland was temporarily suspended in 1972, and then formally abolished in 1973.

The constituency was primarily rural and included areas between Coleraine, Limavady, Derry and Magherafelt.

The seat was held until 1969 by Nationalist Party candidates, and was rarely contested.

Members of Parliament
1929 – 1939: George Leeke, Nationalist Party
1939 – 1945: vacant
1945 – 1953: Eddie McAteer, Nationalist Party
1953 – 1969: Paddy Gormley, Nationalist Party
1969 – 1972: Ivan Cooper, Independent Nationalist (1969–1970); Social Democratic and Labour Party (1970–1972)

Source:

Election results

At the 1929, 1933 and 1938 Northern Ireland general elections, George Leeke was elected unopposed.

At the 1945 and 1949 Northern Ireland general elections, Eddie McAteer was elected unopposed.

At the 1958, 1962 and 1965 Northern Ireland general elections, Paddy Gormley was elected unopposed.

Source:

References

Constituencies of the Northern Ireland Parliament
Northern Ireland Parliament constituencies established in 1929
Historic constituencies in County Londonderry
Northern Ireland Parliament constituencies disestablished in 1973